Magdalen Hsu-Li is a Chinese American singer-songwriter, painter, speaker, writer and cultural activist. She identifies herself as bisexual. She is a leader in the introduction of Asian-American pop music. The singer/songwriter demonstrates talents on acoustic piano, percussion, impromptu stand-up and theater. She additionally reads poetry and improvises musical performances.

Biography
Hsu-Li was born in the southern city of Martinsville, Virginia to Chinese immigrant parents. She began piano lessons at age 8 but was mainly interested in painting in her early years.

She attended college at the Rhode Island School of Design where she won accolades including the Florence Leif Award for Excellence in Painting, the Talbot Rantoul Scholarship and the Chicago Institute of the Arts Oxbow Fellowship.  After graduating, she moved to Seattle, Washington, and discovered a passion for music over visual art. She matriculated at the Cornish College of the Arts, where she studied classical music and jazz and won a music scholarship in 1995. In 2008 she graduated from Berklee College of Music with a degree in songwriting.

Performance and recordings
She began public performances in 1996 and released her first album, Evolution, on her own Chickpop Records label in 1998. Her second album, Fire, was released in 2001 and was named one of Performing Songwriter magazine's top 12 DIY albums of the year, and best producer at the Outvoice Music Awards. Her song "As I am" was included on Performing Songwriter'''s ninth compilation album in 2003. Her third album, Smashing The Ceiling, was released and had performances by the drummer Matt Chamberlain, the violinist Eyvind Kang and the guitarist Timothy Young. After releasing Smashing The Ceiling" she graduated summa cum laude from Berklee College of Music with a Bachelor of Music in 2008. While attending Berklee she was a piano principal in the Songwriting Department, and a recipient of the Berklee Achievement Scholarship and Jack Maher Scholarship for Excellence in Songwriting. She is a multi-instrumentalist who writes most of her songs and tours with her partner Greane.

Music
Hsu-Li's music can be considered derivative of alternative rock, pop, folk and jazz and is described as having "vocals comparable to Tori Amos and Alanis Morissette and music at times reminiscent of Ani DiFranco's solo albums and other times of percussion-driven Rusted Root."

Hsu-Li describes her music as "pop rock alt folk singer-songwriter music with a tinge of country, jazz, and punk."

Reception

Hsu-Li's music has received generally positive reviews. It is described as "exquisitely furious, beautiful, and exciting" by Performing Songwriter magazine, "sweet, melodic, and real" by The New York Times, "an achingly gorgeous collection of piano-based rock recalling the finest moments of Tori Amos or Ben Folds Five" by Yolk magazine and a sumptuous feast for the ears by Curve magazine. "A Magazine" wrote, "her blend of hard-grounded folk and sweet siren lyrics makes an enduring impression upon the American music scene her distinguishing factor is her cool, edgy, sound and courage to be sensitive, tender, and feminine. As she carves her identity as an artist in an industry where Asian women are not thought of as musical powerhouses or innovators – Magdalen is a rare force with which to reckon."

About Fire, the Advocate wrote, "finely crafted, melodic, piano-based songs that borrow equally from pop, folk, jazz, blues and even punk."

In her own words

Her songs visually portray what she sees as a trained painter while addressing universal themes about identity, spirituality, consciousness, love, loss, and relationships. "I write completely from the heart," she says, "but also from my cultural heritages and the places I'm from (the southeast, northeast, and west coast). "One of the problems in our society is a lack of awareness for the wealth of cultural diversity that surrounds us," she says. "I intend to always be defining issues of identity, raising awareness, and bringing communities together through my music, art, and writing.  My primary goal as an artist is to help break through the glass ceiling in America so that Asians and other cultural minorities become accepted as artistic and commercial forces in popular music and other artistic mediums."

Currently, she is working on completing a new book and CD. "This book and its accompanying CD will be the culmination of many stories, chapters, and tales within the paths that my life has taken," she says. "Throughout my life, I have rejected many traditions that were integral to my Chinese heritage, while simultaneously reclaiming others. I did not start out my life knowing what I would become.  Rather, the shape and course of my life were composed like a painting or a piece of music, by the flow of events and people I encountered along the way, the choices that I made."  I've always tried to live my life by listening to my heart and following the Dao." She says, "And I've been fortunate to have some amazing teachers and healers in my life. They've steadied me on my path along the way, giving me insights and guidance to help me be my highest self in this lifetime. It's time to share what they have taught me with others – and that is what this new book and CD will be about".

Discography 
With ChickPop Records
 1997 Muscle and Bone (EP) 
 1998 Evolution 2001 Fire 2005 Smashing the Ceiling''

Notes

Living people
American women singer-songwriters
American musicians of Chinese descent
Bisexual singers
Bisexual songwriters
Bisexual women
LGBT people from Virginia
American LGBT people of Asian descent
American LGBT singers
American LGBT songwriters
Rhode Island School of Design alumni
Berklee College of Music alumni
Cornish College of the Arts alumni
Year of birth missing (living people)
20th-century LGBT people
21st-century LGBT people
21st-century American women
Rhode Island School of Design alumni in music